Rødby is a town, with a population of 1,983 (1 January 2022), located on the island of Lolland in Denmark. It was the seat of the former Rødby Municipality (Danish, kommune).

Rødby Municipality

The former Rødby municipality covered an area of 120 km2, and had a total population of 6,590 (2005). Its last mayor was Hans Ole Sørensen, a member of the Venstre (Liberal Party) political party.

On 1 January 2007 Rødby municipality ceased to exist as the result of Kommunalreformen ("The Municipality Reform" of 2007). It was merged with the existing Holeby, Højreby, Maribo, Nakskov, Ravnsborg, and Rudbjerg municipalities to form the new Lolland Municipality. This creates a municipality with an area of 892 km2 and a total resident population of 49,469 (2005). The new municipality is part of the Region Sjælland ("Zealand Region").

The harbour at Rødbyhavn

Rødbyhavn ("Rødby Harbour") is located approximately 5 km southwest of the town of Rødby.

Notable people 
 Emil Vett (1843 in Rødby – 1911) a Danish businessman who co-founded Magasin du Nord
 Gutte Eriksen (1918 in Rødby – 2008) a Danish ceramist whose works were influenced by time spent in Japan
 Knud Holscher (born 1930 in Rødby) a Danish architect and industrial designer

References

 Municipal statistics: NetBorger Kommunefakta, delivered from KMD aka Kommunedata (Municipal Data)
 Municipal mergers and neighbors: Eniro new municipalities map

External links

 Lolland municipality's official website (Danish only)
 Scandlines (Ferry to Puttgarden)

Former municipalities of Denmark
Cities and towns in Region Zealand
Port cities and towns of the Baltic Sea
Denmark–Germany border crossings
Lolland
Fehmarn
Lolland Municipality